Floyd Williams Tomkins Jr. (New York, February 7, 1850 – Philadelphia, March 24, 1932) was an Episcopal American Deacon, Rector of the Church of the Holy Trinity, Philadelphia in Rittenhouse Square for 33 years from 1899 to his sudden death in 1932.

Biography 

Dr. Tomkins was born in New York City, February 7, 1850 from Floyd W. Tomkins (1815-1898), owner of newspapers in New York in 1870, son of Captain James Tomkins (1785-1859). Captain Tomkins's father Charles was a merchant born in London in 1747 and married in New York in 1782.

He graduated at Harvard in 1872 with the degree of Bachelor of Arts, and from the General Theological Seminary in 1875 with the degree of Bachelor of Divinity.

Ordained the same year to the Diaconate by Bishop Horatio Potter in Old Trinity Church, New York, he went to Colorado as a missionary, where in 1876 he was ordained priest by Bishop John Franklin Spalding. Until 1833 he served as a missionary in Pueblo, Col., Cheyenne, Wyo., Kenosha, Wis. and Minneapolis, Minn. From 1883 he occupied charges in New Hampshire, New York city, Hartford, Conn., Chicago, Ill., and Providence, R.I.

On March 5, 1899 he became Rector of  the Church of the Holy Trinity, Philadelphia. In the Diocese of Pennsylvania he was very active in every kind of religious work and all movements for civic betterment.
He was elected as a Deputy to the General Convention of 1913 and he served a Deputy to all General Conventions until the Denver Convention in 1931.  He was always requested as a preacher and preached in every Diocese and Missionary District of the Church.
He wrote a number of papers on religious subjects and devotional books.

When he died the newspapers published many tributes to “his strong and lovable Christian character”  for clergy and laymen of all communions. Rev Schaeffer,  President of  the General Synod of the Reformed Church in the United States said: ”A great pulpit orator and ready writer with a strong personality, large heart and liberal hands, he was a fearless champion of  righteousness and a stanch defender of the faith.”

The Mayor of Philadelphia J. Hampton Moore said: “He was one of the outstanding clergymen of the city and country. Probably no voice upholding the standard of morality and religion was more familiar than his. A community can ill afford to lose men of such high ideals and sterling worth.”

His funeral officiated by Bishop Francis M. Taitt on March 28, 1932 was attended by hundreds of people, many of which were unable to gain admittance in the church.

In 1919 he helped Philip Jaisohn to organize the League of Friends of Korea in 21 cities of US with the aim to inform the American public of the situation in Korea and persuade the U.S. Government to support the independence of Korea from Japan. He was the President of the Philadelphia League and opened the First Korean Congress on April 14–16, 1919 in Philadelphia with a prayer and a speech. He was awarded the Korean National Medal in 2015.

He married Ann Maria Grant Cutter in 1875 and had one son, Rev Floyd W. Tomkins Sr. (1887-1979), founder of the ecumenical movement, and three daughters, Dr. Ann Maria Cutter Gibson, founder of Singing Eagle Lodge camp, Sarah Graham Tomkins and Dr. Mary Jeannette Keney Tomkins.

Bibliography 
	Floyd W. Tomkins, Beacons on life's voyage; brief answers to personal problems, Philadelphia, G.W. Jacobs & Co., 1903, reprinted by Forgotten Books
	Floyd W. Tomkins, Following Christ, Philadelphia, G. W. Jacobs & co., 1901, reprinted by Forgotten Books
	Floyd W. Tomkins, Prayers for the quiet hour, Boston and Chicago, United society of Christian endeavor, c1910, reprinted by Forgotten Books
	Floyd W. Tomkins, contrib.: Russell H. Conwell, Founder of the Institutional Church in America: The Work and the Man, by Agnes Rush Burr
	Floyd W. Tomkins, Prohibition, The Annals of the American Academy of Political and Social Science, September 1, 1923
	Floyd W. Tomkins, The Christian Life, What It Is, and How to Live It, 1896, reprinted by Forgotten Books
	Floyd W. Tomkins, The Faith and Life of a Christian, reprinted by Forgotten Books
	Bishop Officiates the Burial Service of Rev. Dr. Floyd W. Tomkins at Church of the Holy Trinity, Rittenhouse Square (1932) , Church News, April 1932 
	Floyd W. Tomkins, First Korean Congress: Philadelphia, 1919, reprinted in 2018 by Forgotten Books

Honours
  Korean National Medal, 2015

Quotes
"Let the resurrection joy lift us from loneliness and weakness and despair to strength and beauty and happiness"

Notes

External links
 

1850 births
1932 deaths
American Episcopal priests
Harvard College alumni
General Theological Seminary alumni
Korean independence activists